Panchetocynodon is an extinct genus of cynodonts from  and named after the Early Triassic (Induan) Panchet Formation of India.

References 

Prehistoric cynodont genera
Early Triassic synapsids
Induan life
Triassic synapsids of Asia
Fossils of India
Fossil taxa described in 2012